Pushpay Holdings Limited, known as Pushpay, is a donor management system for charities operating within the United States.

It is publicly listed on the New Zealand Stock Exchange NZX and the Australian Securities Exchange ASX under the ticker code PPH. Pushpay joined the NZX50 Index in December 2017  and the ASX All Ordinaries Index in March 2018. Pushpay was added to the S&P/ASX All Technology Index upon its launch in February 2020.

History 
In December 2019, Pushpay acquired 100% of the ownership interests in Church Community Builder for a total cash consideration of US$87.5 million, subject to customary adjustments, funded through a combination of cash on hand and proceeds from an amortising senior secured debt facility of US$62.5 million. In November 2016, Pushpay acquired Bluebridge's church app related business.   

In September 2020, released ChurchStaq, a suite including a church management system, mobile app, donor management and giving solution.

References

External links 
 

Companies of New Zealand
Software companies of New Zealand